Meshir 5 - Coptic Calendar - Meshir 7

The sixth day of the Coptic month of Meshir, the sixth month of the Coptic year. On a common year, this day corresponds to January 31, of the Julian Calendar, and February 13, of the Gregorian Calendar. This day falls in the Coptic Season of Shemu, the season of the Harvest.

Commemorations

Martyrs 

 The martyrdom of Saint Cyrus and Saint John 
 The martyrdom of Saint Athansia and her three daughters, the Virginal Saints, Theodora, Theopisti, and Theodosia

Saints 

 The departure of Pope Mark IV, the 84th Patriarch of the See of Saint Mark 
 The departure of Saint Zanofios

Other commemorations 

 The appearance of the Body of Pope Hippolytus, Patriarch of Rome.

References 

Days of the Coptic calendar